Xiangyang Subdistrict is a subdistrict in Zhifu District, Yantai, Shandong, China. , it has eight residential communities under its administration.

See also 
 List of township-level divisions of Shandong

References 

Township-level divisions of Shandong
Yantai